The Milwaukee Road Historic District is a historic district encompassing the Milwaukee Road railway depot and facilities in Harlowton, Montana. The depot was built in 1908, and rail service to Harlowton began the same year. In 1916, the facilities at Harlowton gained international renown when the Milwaukee Road made the depot the eastern endpoint of an electrified section of rail which extended to Avery, Idaho. The electrified section was the longest stretch of electric railroad in the United States; Thomas Edison described the railroad as an "unmatched technical marvel". Harlowton was also an important division point for the railroad, and its facilities include the railroad's standardized Class A passenger station and a rare example of an intact roundhouse. In addition to its importance to the railroad, the Harlowton rail facilities were also important to the local economy, as the railroad was the city's largest employer. The Milwaukee Road filed for bankruptcy in 1977 and ceased operations in the Northwest United States in 1980.

The district was added to the National Register of Historic Places on July 8, 1988, three years after the Milwaukee's acquision by the Soo Line Railroad.

References

Railway stations on the National Register of Historic Places in Montana
Transportation in Wheatland County, Montana
Harlowton
Railway stations in the United States opened in 1908
Historic districts on the National Register of Historic Places in Montana
National Register of Historic Places in Wheatland County, Montana
1908 establishments in Montana
Former railway stations in Montana